Flutter Entertainment plc, formerly Paddy Power Betfair plc, is an international sports betting and gambling company. It is listed on the London Stock Exchange, and is a constituent of the FTSE 100 Index. It owns brands such as Betfair, FanDuel, Paddy Power, PokerStars and Sportsbet.

History
Paddy Power and British rival Betfair agreed terms for a merger on 8 September 2015. The business is owned 52% by the former Paddy Power shareholders and 48% by the former Betfair shareholders. The merger was completed on 2 February 2016. On 5 April 2016, it was announced that 650 jobs in the United Kingdom and the Republic of Ireland would be lost at the company.

On 18 October 2016, the company paid out $1.1M to those who bet on Hillary Clinton in the presidential election in the United States, citing a certainty of Clinton's victory. Trump won. In May 2017, it acquired daily fantasy sports operator Draft. In August 2017, it was announced that Peter Jackson, CEO of Worldpay UK, would succeed Breon Corcoran as CEO of Paddy Power Betfair.

In March 2018, the company announced that it would be implementing an electronic self exclusion process through its in-shop app. The new system will replace the current paper based process, and will be implemented across the United Kingdom.

In May 2018, Paddy Power Betfair announced its intent to acquire FanDuel, one of the two leading daily fantasy sports operators in the United States. The deal was part of an effort to bolster the company's assets in the United States, following the overturning of a federal prohibition on sports betting. As part of the acquisition, the company paid $158 million and merged its existing operations in the United States into FanDuel to form FanDuel Group. It holds a 61% controlling stake, with the option to increase its stake to 80% after three years and 100% after five.

In October 2018, Paddy Power Betfair was fined £2.2 million by the Gambling Commission for failing to protect customers showing signs of problem gambling, and for failing to carry out adequate anti money-laundering checks.

In February 2019, the company announced the acquisition of a 51% controlling stake in adjarabet, a business operating in the Georgian gambling industry with an option to acquire the remaining 49% after three years.

On 6 March 2019, Paddy Power Betfair announced that it would rebrand as Flutter Entertainment, pending shareholder approval at the company’s annual general meeting in May. Flutter was originally the name of a betting exchange acquired by Betfair in December 2001. The company argued that the changing in name was meant to reflect the growing number of consumer brands in its portfolio.

On 2 October 2019, Flutter Entertainment announced its acquisition of Canadian gambling operator The Stars Group for US$6.95 billion, creating the world's largest online gambling company based on revenues. As part of the purchase, media company Fox Corporation (who held a minority stake in The Stars Group) took a 2.6% minority stake in Flutter Entertainment, and will have the option to acquire an 18.5% stake in FanDuel Group in July 2021. On 3 December 2020, Flutter announced that it would purchase an additional stake in FanDuel Group from Fastball Holdings for $4.1 billion in a cash-and-stock deal, increasing its stake to 95%.

In April 2021, amid discussion of a FanDuel Group initial public offering, Fox sued Flutter over its option to acquire a stake in FanDuel, stating that Fox's purchase price should be at a $11.2 billion valuation, the same as Flutter's purchase price of FanDuel in December 2020, rather than based on Flutter's valuation of fair market value as of July 2021.

In December 2021, Flutter Entertainment announced it would be acquiring Italy’s leading online games provider Sisal Gaming, for €1.913bn/£1.62bn. The transaction is expected to complete during the second quarter of 2022.

In January 2022, Flutter acquired the online bingo company Tombola.

In November 2022, an arbitrator ruled that Fox Corporation had an option to acquire an 18.6% stake in FanDuel for $3.7 billion, based on a valuation of $20 billion, with the price increasing by 5% for each year of the 10-year option.

Operations
The new business maintains separate brands in the United Kingdom, Ireland and Italy. It operates across four divisions; Online, Retail, Australia and the United States. The online division comprises Paddy Power and Betfair in the United Kingdom and Ireland. Betfair also operates an online betting exchange.

The retail division operates over six hundred betting shops in the United Kingdom and Ireland. In Australia, they own Sportsbet. The division in the United States includes FanDuel, Fox Bet (a partnership with Fox Corporation, which is branded with and cross-promoted by its Fox Sports division), and TVG, a pari-mutuel online betting network, which is active in thirty five states. In New Jersey, the company has an online casino and a horse racing betting exchange. In the U.S., FanDuel operates FanDuel TV, formerly known as TVG Network, which focuses on coverage of horse racing, and studio coverage of mainstream sports from the perspective of betting.

Sky Betting and Gaming, Paddy Power and Betfair are regulated in the United Kingdom by the Gambling Commission.

The Board is chaired by Gary McGann, appointed in 2015. Other non-executive Board members include Andrew Higginson, Zillah Byng-Thorne, Atif Rafiq, Nancy Cruickshank, Richard Flint, Mary Turner, Alfred F. Hurley, David Lazzarato, Nancy Dubuc, and Holly Keller Koeppel.

References

External links
Official site

Bookmakers
Gambling companies of Ireland
Holding companies of Ireland
Holding companies established in 2016
Companies based in Dublin (city)
Irish companies established in 2016
Companies listed on Euronext Dublin
Companies listed on the London Stock Exchange
Companies in the Euro Stoxx 50